Newtownards is a town in County Down, Northern Ireland. It lies at the most northern tip of Strangford Lough, 10 miles (16 km) east of Belfast, on the Ards Peninsula. It is in the civil parish of Newtownards and the historic baronies of Ards Lower and Castlereagh Lower. Newtownards is in the Ards and North Down Borough. The population was 28,050 in the 2011 Census.

History

Irish settlement
In 540 AD, St. Finian founded Movilla Abbey, a monastery, on a hill overlooking Strangford Lough about a mile northeast of present-day Newtownards town centre. "Movilla" (Magh Bhile) means "the plain of the sacred tree" in Irish, which suggests that the land had previously been a sacred pagan site. It became a significant Christian settlement - a centre for worship, study, mission and commercial trade, well known throughout Ireland. It was sacked by the Vikings sometime after AD 824, though survived for a thousand years as a monastic settlement (becoming part of the Augustinian Order in 1135), until the Dissolution of the Monasteries in 1542. 

The Normans conquered east Ulster in the 1170s, founding the Earldom of Ulster. Around 1226, they established a new town around Movilla, which became known as the "New Town of Blathewic", after the Irish territory of Uí Blathmhaic. A Dominican priory was built in 1244 by Walter de Burgh and was also dissolved in 1542.

In 1572, both monasteries were burned by the Clannaboy O'Neills under Sir Brian McPhelim O'Neill to deny buildings to the English, who were attempting to colonize the Ards. After this the urban settlement at Movilla disappeared and the area around it became known as "Ballylisnevin" ("the town of Nevin's fort").

The Scottish town

In 1605 (prior to the official Plantation of Ulster in 1610), Hugh Montgomery was granted the lands and set about rebuilding what was by then known as Newtown, later expanded to Newtownards. Official records show the town was established in 1606. Montgomery built a residence in the ruins of the old priory, the tower of which remains. Scottish Protestant settlers, particularly from Ayr, and to a lesser extent Irvine, in Ayrshire, arrived in large numbers and the town grew quickly.

Due to the shallow mud of Strangford Lough, Newtown never developed as a port, with goods instead transported from the nearby town of Donaghadee on the Irish Sea coast of the Ards Peninsula. Instead, it became a market town, with the Market House in Conway Square constructed in 1771.

United Irishmen rebellion

North Down and the Ards were briefly held by United Irish insurgents in the Irish Rebellion of 1798. On the morning of 9 June, "Pike Sunday", United Irishmen, mainly from Bangor, Donaghadee, Greyabbey and Ballywalter, under the command of the Presbyterian licentiate (later American diplomat) David Bailie Warden, marched on the town. They were driven off with musket fire from the Market House, but the garrison, consisting of troops from the York Fencible Regiment of Foot subsequently withdrew, allowing the rebels to establish a French revolutionary-style Committee of Public Safety. The "Republic" in Newtownards did not survive the rout two days later of the main rebel force at Ballynahinch.

The Great Famine
During the Great Famine, which resulted from the dependence of small tenants and cottiers on a blighted potato crop, the largest local landowner, Lord Londonderry, rejected rent reductions on grounds of "personal inconvenience". By 1847 the 800 inhabitants of the town were witness to "emaciated and half-famished souls" queuing at soup kitchens and overflowing the newly built workhouse. Despite Lord Londonderry's objection, with the upgrading of the road to Donaghadee several public works programs for famine relief were instigated. In general, conditions on the land, not as acutely subdivided as in western districts of Ireland, and the availability of weaving and other employments, saved the town from the worst.

Victorian growth
The early 19th century saw the reclamation of the marshlands south of the town. At the same time, its growth was accelerated by integration into the Belfast and Lagan Valley industrial region and market. The Belfast and County Down Railway connected Newtownards to Belfast, via Comber and Dundonald, in 1850, and to Donaghadee in 1861. By the same year, the town's population had risen to 9,500. (This rail line was closed in 1950.) On 12 July 1867, despite the Party Processions Acts, the Orange Order paraded from Bangor to Newtownards. The parade was organised by William Johnston (sentenced to a short term in prison the next year for his actions) and about 30,000 took part.

As the nineteenth century progressed the economy became increasingly tied to the growing city of Belfast and the town continued to prosper and by the 20th century had increasingly become a commuter town. Newtownards' population reached 13,100 in 1961 and had doubled to 28,000 by 2011.

The Troubles
During the Troubles, Newtownards was the scene of a car bomb attack on 5 July 1993, when Roma's Bar in Regent Street was targeted. The pub was destroyed, but has since been rebuilt. The attack was carried out by the Provisional Irish Republican Army with a 700 kg (1,500 lb) device. There were no fatalities. Police said the 10-minute warning, telephoned to a local radio station, was "totally inadequate." The warning said the bomb contained 1,500 pounds of explosives.

Recent times
On 1 November 2021, a bus in the town was hijacked and set on fire by two masked assailants allegedly protesting the Northern Ireland Protocol.

Places of interest

Scrabo Tower

The tower is 41 metres high, and was erected on Scrabo Hill as a memorial to Charles Stewart, 3rd Marquess of Londonderry in 1857. Those loyal to the Stewart family suggested the inspiration lay in the gratitude of his tenantry for his solicitude during the famine. Given the popular criticism the Marquess in those years, this seems doubtful. In 1847 he and his wife made contributions of £20 and £10 to their local relief committees. The following year they expended £15,000 renovating their home in Mount Stewart. Only 450 subscribers were connected to the estate on which there were 1,200 tenants farmers and many associated employees. Two-thirds of the cost was met by 98 subscribers (on a list headed by Emperor Napoleon III of France), most of whom were fellow gentry.

The Scottish baronial-style tower is open to the public and houses a historical and local environment exhibition. The basalt-topped sandstone hill at Scrabo is one of the dominant features of north Down. The tower now stands in Scrabo Country Park with its woodland walks and parkland through Killynether Wood.

Movilla Abbey
The ancient ruins of Movilla Abbey, monastic settlement are situated within the grounds of Movilla Cemetery. Nothing visible remains today of Finnian's original Celtic Abbey, but the 15th Century Augustinian ruins still stand, and are worth seeing. They are a part of the St Patrick's Trail Tourist Route

Somme Heritage Centre
The Somme Heritage Centre, which is situated a little north of the town, is the Somme Association's flagship project. Situated adjacent to the Clandeboye Estate outside Newtownards, the centre is a unique visitor attraction of international significance showing the reality of the Great War and its effects on the community at home. The centre commemorates the involvement of the 36th (Ulster) and 16th (Irish) divisions in the Battle of the Somme, the 10th (Irish) Division in Gallipoli, Salonika and Palestine, and provides displays and information on the entire Irish contribution to the First World War.

Mount Stewart
On the east shore of Strangford Lough, a few miles outside Newtownards and near Greyabbey, stands Mount Stewart, an 18th-century house and garden – the home of the Londonderry family. The house and its contents reflect the history of the Londonderrys who played a leading role in British social and political life. The ninety-eight acre garden at Mount Stewart has been proposed as a UNESCO World Heritage Site.

Demography
On Census Day (27 March 2011) the usually resident population of Newtownards was 28,050 accounting for 1.55% of the NI total. Of these:
 98.67% were from the white (including Irish Traveller) ethnic group;
 8.32% belong to or were brought up Catholic Christian and 79.35% belong to or were brought up in a 'Protestant and other (non-Catholic) Christian (including Christian related)'  and
 76.37% indicated that they had a British national identity, 4.86% had an Irish national identity and 31.39% had a Northern Irish national identity.
Respondents could indicate more than one national identity

Sport
Rugby
Ards Rugby Football Club plays at Lansdowne Road, south of the town along the main Comber road.

Cricket
Ards and Donaghadee Cricket Club currently plays its home games take place at Londonderry Park, which is on Portaferry Road.

Football
There are two local football teams: Ards F.C., who play in the NIFL's Danske Bank Premiership, and Ards Rangers F.C., who play in the Northern Amateur Football League.

Ards motor racing Circuit

The Ards Circuit through Newtownards was a motorsport street circuit used for RAC Tourist Trophy sports car races from 1928 until 1936. At the time it was Northern Ireland's premier sporting event, regularly attracting crowds in excess of a quarter of a million people.

On 5 September 1936, in appallingly wet conditions, local driver Jack Chambers lost control of his Riley approaching the Strangford Arms in Newtownards at the Newtownards rail bridge and crashed into the crowd, killing eight spectators. This tragedy brought an end to nine years of racing over the Ards street circuit.

Notable natives/residents
 Christine Bleakley, television presenter known for her work on ITV, was raised in Newtownards
 Harry Cavan, senior VP of FIFA (1980–90), and president of the Irish Football Association from 1958 to 1994.
Sir Robert Colville (died  1697), politician  and  landowner,  owned much property in and near Newtownards.
 Jason Dunkerley, Canadian five-time paralympic medalist, was born and raised in Newtownards. His family emigrated to Canada when he was 14.
 Nick Earls, a novelist born in 1963 in the area; he later moved to Brisbane, Australia.
 Celia de Fréine, dramatist and poet, was born in the town in 1948 before later moving to Dublin and Galway.
 Eddie Irvine, racing driver and runner-up in the 1999 Formula One World Championship for Ferrari, was born and lived in Conlig, near Newtownards.
 Martyn Irvine, former World Cycling Champion and two-time silver medalist, is from the town.
 Michael Legge, stand-up comedian, was born and raised in the town.
Alex Lightbody, former Northern  Ireland, Irish  and British open lawn bowls singles champion
 Robert Blair "Paddy" Mayne, SAS co-founder, was born and lived in Newtownards and attended Regent House Grammar School. A bronze statue of him stands outside the town hall. He played rugby for Ireland and for the Lions in the 1938 British Lions tour to South Africa.
 Barry McClements, Commonwealth Games para swimming medallist
 Rhys McClenaghan, Irish international gymnast, 2020 Tokyo Olympic pommel horse finalist, was born and lives in Newtownards.
 Colin Nixon, former football player who managed Ards, is from Newtownards.
 Ricky Warwick, best known as the frontman for the Scottish band The Almighty, is from the town.

See also
 Newtownards (civil parish)
 Market Houses in Northern Ireland
 List of civil parishes of County Down
 List of localities in Northern Ireland by population

References

Further reading
 Hanna, J. and Quail, D. 2006. Old Newtownards. Stenlake Publishing Ltd. .

External links

 Newtownards Directory 1910
 Newtownards Online

 
Civil parish of Newtownards